The Crimean journey of Catherine the Great (also known as Таврический вояж (Taurida Voyage) at the time) was a six-month (January 2, 1787 – July 11, 1787) inspection trip of Catherine II of Russia to the newly acquired lands of New Russia and Crimea, gained as a result of the victorious wars against the Ottoman Empire (1735–39 and 1768–74) and peace treaties with the Cossack Hetmanate followed by the forced liquidation of free Zaporozhian Sich.

The trip was carried out with her court and several ambassadors. During the trip, she met with the Austrian emperor Joseph II, travelling incognito. The trip was arranged by Grigory Potemkin, a favorite and lover of Catherine II. The trip happened when the Russo-Turkish War (1787–1792) was just about to erupt.

Since these times, the expression "Potemkin village" came into being, referring to the legend about fake villages hastily erected by Potemkin along the Catherine's route in order to impress the Empress.

References

Further reading

Russian translation of the memoir of Louis Philippe, comte de Ségur who took the trip as a French ambassador; see also here

Catherine the Great
1787 in the Russian Empire
Crimea in the Russian Empire
Voyages